The Sandy ridgefin eel (Callechelys cliffi) is an eel in the family Ophichthidae (worm/snake eels). It was described by James Erwin Böhlke and John Carmon Briggs in 1954. It is a marine, tropical eel which is known from the eastern central Pacific Ocean, including Mexico and Panama.

The species epithet "cliffi" refers to Frank S. Cliff. Due to there being an extremely limited number of known specimens, and thereby a lack of information on the species' distribution and population, threats and habitat requirements, the IUCN redlist currently lists the Sandy ridgefin eel as Data Deficient.

References

Ophichthidae
Fish described in 1954
Taxa named by Eugenia Brandt Böhlke